Oenomaus cyanovenata is a species of butterfly of the family Lycaenidae. It is found in very wet lowland forests in Costa Rica, Panama, French Guiana, Venezuela, Bolivia and Brazil.

Larvae have been reared on Guatteria verrucosa.

References

Butterflies described in 1995
Eumaeini
Lycaenidae of South America